Ștefan Ioan Tofan (born February 25, 1965) in Huși, is a former Romanian rugby union football player. He played as a centre.

Club career
Tofan played for Dinamo București during his career.

International career
Tofan gathered 20 caps for Romania, from his debut in 1985 to his last game in 1994. He scored 2 conversions during his international career, 4 points on aggregate. He was a member of his national side for the 1st and 2nd Rugby World Cups in 1987 and 1991 and played in 3 group matches in 1987.

Honours
Dinamo București
 Divizia Națională: 1990-91, 1993–94

References

External links

1965 births
Living people
Romanian rugby union players
Romania international rugby union players
CS Dinamo București (rugby union) players
Rugby union centres
People from Huși